Machimus cingulatus is a Palearctic species of robber fly in the family Asilidae.

References

External links
Geller Grim Robberflies of Germany

Asilidae
Insects described in 1814
Asilomorph flies of Europe